Zychowicz is a Polish surname. Notable people with the surname include:

Bogusław Zychowicz (born 1961), Polish swimmer
Piotr Zychowicz (born 1980), Polish journalist and writer
Zbigniew Zychowicz (1953–2016), Polish politician

Polish-language surnames